Open Sesame is the first full-length album by Shaft. It was released in 2004 on Lil' Chief Records, although a number of the songs featured had been in the band's live set for almost a decade. The band played a show to support the launch of the album in which an attempt was made to feature as many ex-members of the band as possible. The show culminated with nine people on stage, including two drummers and four guitarists.

Track listing
 "Ginger's Kisses" – 3:33
 "Cheap Candy" – 3:13
 "Dinah" – 3:55
 "Might As Well Be Dumb" – 3:55
 "Livin' Pumpin' Heart" – 3:25
 "I Just Wanna Have Your Baby" – 2:24
 "I Don't Wanna Rock'n'Roll Tonight" – 2:46
 "Scorpio Rising" – 3:44
 "One Of Many" – 3:20
 "Playing With Ourselves" – 2:52
 "Can You Feel It (Parts 1 & 2)" – 4:02
 "Just Because" – 2:44
 "Kein Essen" – 2:12
 "Rosy Diamond" – 3:20
 "Sucking The Pig" – 4:12

External links
Lil' Chief Records: Shaft
Lil' Chief Records

2004 albums
Shaft (New Zealand band) albums
Lil' Chief Records albums